Mesoderm-specific transcript homolog protein is a protein that in humans is encoded by the MEST gene.

This gene encodes a member of the Alpha/beta hydrolase superfamily and has isoform-specific imprinting. The loss of imprinting of this gene has been linked to certain types of cancer and may be due to promoter switching. The encoded protein may play a role in development. Three transcript variants encoding two distinct isoforms have been identified for this gene. A pseudogene for this locus is located on chromosome 6.

References

Further reading